Teddington School is a co-educational state school for ages 11–18, located in Teddington in the borough of Richmond upon Thames in south-west London.   It has had academy status since 2012, and is operated by the Bourne Trust. It opened a co-educational sixth form in 2014.

Performance
As with other schools, latest exam results and related data are published in the Department for Education's national tables.

History
The school opened in 1962 as the Teddington Secondary School, a single-sex school, taking over the senior boys of Stanley Road School when it ceased to cater for the full age-range, as well as the boys from Twickenham Technical School. Pupils from the former St Mark's School in St Marks Road joined Teddington School in April 1963.

From the late 1960s to the mid-1980s it was called Teddington Boys' School, the name being changed to Teddington School on the admission of girls in 1985 for the first time. The school's uniform colours during this period were black and red, with a school blazer badge displaying a swan upon a green background, the coat of arms of the County of Middlesex and a gold lion rampant on a red background, with the motto in Latin Meret Qui Laborat beneath. In the 1960s, the six houses were Bannister, Faraday, Brunel, Lovell, Churchill and Fleming.

In 2010 under a central government public works programme entitled Building Schools for the Future, the original mid-20th century design school buildings on the Broom Road site and its attached hardcourt sports fields of an athletics field, football pitch and tennis courts, were demolished, and a new school building and sports ground were constructed by the builder Mace Group Limited at a cost of £36 million. The new building was given a BREEAM "Excellent" utility rating and was opened on 13 May 2011 by Vince Cable, the Member of Parliament for Twickenham, who in a speech praised its "brilliant architectural design", and how its structure "explores new ways of learning, creating a learning village around a social square". Richard Weeks, the Headteacher of the school at the time, stated that the new building "created a new learning environment physically and culturally which is very much more appropriate to the needs of the 21st Century". The school was also re-branded at this time, with its uniform being fundamentally redesigned to a teal and grey colour scheme and a kingfisher bird emblem.

The new school was initially designated as a "Specialist Visual Arts College", but was reclassified to Academy status in August 2012.

An Ofsted inspection in February 2014 rated the school as "Good", stating that pupils were making "strong progress", and that the "teaching standard was good".

A new two-storey building was constructed for an additional 240 pupils in 2014 with the inauguration of a sixth form at the school in 2014, in line with Richmond Borough Council's secondary school education policy. In the 2015 year school leaving examinations the school exceeded its target results, however concerns were raised with the fact that around 40% of the school's sixth form AS-level examinees had failed to achieve pass grades in the subjects of Mathematics and Biology. John Wilkinson the School's newly appointed Headteacher addressed the concerns by stating that the results in this regard had under-performed because the Biology syllabus needed to be restructured, and the Mathematics results had been impaired by the admission of sixth-form students with lower GCSE grades than was standard educational practice, citing the need for schools to "be brave" in such matters, and not play safe in pursuance of short-term results statistics.

In September 2017 on his appointment to the post of Chief Executive of the Richmond West Schools' Trust, John Wilkinson was re-designated as the Teddington School's "Executive Headteacher", with Kathy Pacey being appointed as its new "Head of School". In February 2018 Ofsted praised the functioning of the school's sixth form, but rated Teddington School otherwise as "Requiring Improvement", citing after an inspection in January 2018 concerns with: the main school's management; aspects of its quality of teaching - which was described as generally "not good enough"; pupils being inattentive and pettily disruptive in some classes; that the school's internal administrative self-evaluation reporting had been found to be inaccurate to the degree that it created an overly generous impression of the school's working state, and a Governing body that was not properly executing its role of independent scrutiny of the school's managerial authority, to which it had become too close. Following the Ofsted findings the Chair of Governors resigned her post with immediate effect.

In September 2018 the Government's Education and Skills Funding Agency issued Teddington School with a formal "Financial Notice to Improve" due to failing to set a balanced budget, and concerns over its financial control.

The school became part of the Bourne Education Trust chain of schools in December 2019.

Exchange programme
The school has run an exchange programme with the Geschwister-Scholl-Schule  in Konstanz since 1976.

Notable alumni

 Sandy Abi-Elias, international women’s footballer for Lebanon
 Stewart Castledine, professional footballer and television presenter
 Nell Tiger Free, actress
Tom Ilube CBE, Chair of the Rugby Football Union 
 Keira Knightley, actress
 Bill Milner, actor
 Sean Pertwee, actor
 Lenny Pidgeley, professional footballer

Notes

External links
Teddington School official site

References

1962 establishments in England
Academies in the London Borough of Richmond upon Thames
Educational institutions established in 1962
Schools in Teddington
Secondary schools in the London Borough of Richmond upon Thames